Chugwater Creek is a tributary of the Laramie River in southeastern Wyoming in the United States. The stream rises northeast of Laramie, in the Laramie Mountains in eastern Albany County and flows . It flows northeast, emerges from the mountains and flows past Chugwater, where it turns north-northwest, and flows past Slater.

See also
Chugwater formation, redbeds
List of Wyoming rivers

References

External links

Rivers of Wyoming
Tributaries of the Platte River
Rivers of Albany County, Wyoming
Rivers of Platte County, Wyoming